John S. Williams House and Farm, also known as Old Chatham Sheepherding Farm and Inn, is a historic home and farm designated a national historic district and located at Chatham in Columbia County, New York.  The district includes seven contributing buildings.  They are: the main house, a farm employee cottage, another cottage, a stone tool shed (originally a smoke house), and three small barns / garages.  The main house is a two-story, frame building with a center hall plan.  The house dates to the about 1770, but was extensively enlarged and remodelled in 1935–1936 in the Colonial Revival style, under direction by New York City architects Polhemus & Coffin.

It was listed on the National Register of Historic Places in 1996.

References

External links
Old Chatham Sheepherding Company…Award-Winning Sheep �s Milk Cheese & Yogurt

Historic districts on the National Register of Historic Places in New York (state)
Houses on the National Register of Historic Places in New York (state)
Colonial Revival architecture in New York (state)
Houses completed in 1770
Houses in Columbia County, New York
National Register of Historic Places in Columbia County, New York
1770 establishments in the Province of New York
Farms on the National Register of Historic Places in New York (state)